Yann Peifer (born 6 March 1974), known professionally as Yanou, is a German trance and Eurodance musician and producer. He is most famous for collaborating on DJ Sammy's hit "Heaven" with vocalist Do and for being a member of the popular German trance acts Tune Up! with DJ Manian, and Cascada alongside Natalie Horler as well as Manian. Before Yanou worked with Tune Up!, Cascada and DJ Sammy, he produced and wrote tracks for "Beam & Yanou" in the late 1990s.

Discography

2001 "Heaven" – DJ Sammy and Yanou ft. Do, (UK #1, US #8), BPI: 2× Platinum

2002 "Heaven (Candlelight Mix)" – DJ Sammy and Yanou ft. Do
2002 "On & On" – Yanou ft. Do
2004 "Miracle" - Cascada
2005 "Everytime We Touch (Yanou's Candlelight Mix)" – Cascada
2006 "King of My Castle" – Yanou ft. Liz
2007 "Sun Is Shining"- Yanou
2007 "What Hurts the Most (Yanou's Candlelight Mix)" – Cascada
2008 "A Girl Like You" – Yanou ft. Mark Daviz
2008 "Children of the Sun" – Yanou
2009 "Brighter Day" – Yanou ft. Anita Davis
2009 "Draw the Line (Yanou's Candlelight Mix) – Cascada
2010 "Pyromania" - Cascada
2011 "San Francisco" – Cascada
2011 "Au Revoir" - Cascada
2011 "Night Nurse" - Cascada
2012 "It's a Fine Day" - John Modena & Yanou
2012 "Summer of Love" - Cascada
2012 "The Rhythm of the Night" - Cascada
2013 "25 Lightyears Away" – Yanou
2013 "Glorious" - Cascada
2013 "The World Is in My Hands" - Cascada
2014 "Bring on the Sun" – Yanou ft. Andreas Johnson
2014 "Madness" - Cascada
2015 "Reason" - Cascada
2017 "Run" - Cascada
2018 "Back for Good" - Cascada
2019  "Like the Way I Do" - Cascada
2020  "I'm Feeling It (In the Air) - Cascada
2021  "One Last Dance" - Cascada
2021 "Never Let Me Go" - Cascada

Beam & Yanou
1997 "On Y Va"
1998 "Paraiso"
2000 "Rainbow of Mine"
2000 "Sound of Love"
2000 "Free Fall"

Remixes
1997 "Shout! (Beam & Yanou Remix)"
1997 "Encore! – Le Disc Jockey (Beam & Yanou Remix) "
1997 "The Original (Beam & Yanou Remix)"
1997 "The Full House (Beam & Yanou Remix)"
1998 "Deeper Than Deep (Beam & Yanou Remix)"
1998 "Light of Mystery (Beam & Yanou Remix)"
1999 "Look at Us (Beam vs. Yanou)"
2000 "E Nomine – E Nomine (Beam & Yanou)"
2000 "Sinéad O'Connor – Nothing Compares 2 U (Beam & Yanou)"
2000 "Love Is the Answer (Beam & Yanou)"
2000 "Cosmic Gate – Somewhere Over the Rainbow / Fire Wire (Beam & Yanou)"
2001 "Geil (DJ Beam & Yanou)"
2001 "Cosmic Gate – Somewhere Over the Rainbow (Part II) (Beam & Yanou)"

References

External links
 Yanou at Discogs.com

Eurodance musicians
German dance musicians
German record producers
Electronic dance music DJs
Living people
1974 births